The Queen of Whitechapel (German: Die Königin von Whitechapel) is a 1922 German silent film directed by Wolfgang Neff and starring Esther Carena, Hermann Vallentin, and Claire Rommer.

The film's sets were designed by the art director Franz Schroedter.

Cast
 Esther Carena as Ninette  
 Hermann Vallentin as Bertot
 Claire Rommer as Harriet Wolsey  
 Marian Alma as Notar Graham 
 Magnus Stifter as Harper  
 Hugo Fischer-Köppe as Viscont Chalton  
 Adele Hartwig as Parker  
 Hermann Picha as Komiker  
 Max Ruhbeck as Lord Wolsey

References

Bibliography
 Hans-Michael Bock & Michael Töteberg. Das Ufa-Buch. Zweitausendeins, 1992.

External links

1922 films
Films of the Weimar Republic
Films directed by Wolfgang Neff
German silent feature films
Films set in London
German black-and-white films